Kalivati Gerald Meehan (born 9 March 1970) is an Australian professional boxer of Fijian descent. He turned pro after a career in rugby league. His son Willis Meehan plays rugby league and boxes.

Amateur career
Before becoming professional, Meehan fought as an amateur with a record of 23–5.

Professional career
Nicknamed "Meanhands", Meehan's memorable appearances include a contested loss in the WBO heavyweight title bout to Lamon Brewster, KO loss to Hasim Rahman, and a first-round TKO loss to Danny Williams in another title bout for British Commonwealth crown.

He had been the Australian heavyweight champion with multiple successful defences until 2000 when he vacated the title.

In October 2007, Meehan beat contender DaVarryl Williamson, knocking him down and winning via a TKO in the 6th round.

In February 2008, he defeated Jeremy Bates knocking him out in the 3rd round of a 10-round bout.

in 2010 he lost to Ruslan Chagaev in May on a points decision and beat Evans Quinn in September, also on points.

In 2015 he lost to Joseph Parker by TKO in the third round.

Television career
Meehan is a co-anchor of Fight Call Out on Fox Sports

Professional boxing record

Title reigns

Awards and recognitions
2019 Gladrap Boxing Hall of fame

References

External links
 http://www.solidboxing.co.nz Kali Meehan's profile and news.
 

1970 births
Living people
Fijian male boxers
Heavyweight boxers
Australian male boxers
New Zealand people of I-Taukei Fijian descent
I-Taukei Fijian people
New Zealand expatriates in Australia
Fijian expatriates in Australia
People from Auckland
New Zealand world boxing champions